29th Infantry Brigade' can refer to

 29th Infantry Brigade Combat Team (United States)
 29th Infantry Brigade (United Kingdom)